The individual eventing at the 1980 Summer Olympics took place between 25 and 27 July at the Trade Unions' Equestrian Complex.

The competition was split into three phases:

Dressage (25 July)
Riders performed the dressage test.
Endurance (26 July)
Riders tackled roads and tracks, steeplechase and cross-country portions.
Jumping (27 July)
Riders jumped at the show jumping course.

Results

References

Equestrian at the 1980 Summer Olympics